Věstín is a municipality and village in Žďár nad Sázavou District in the Vysočina Region of the Czech Republic. It has about 200 inhabitants.

Administrative parts
Villages of Bolešín and Věstínek are administrative parts of Věstín.

References

Villages in Žďár nad Sázavou District